GTL Infrastructure Limited (GTL Infra). a Global Group Enterprise is India's independent telecom Tower Company. It is a pioneer in the Shared Passive Telecom Infrastructure space in India.

Headquartered in Navi Mumbai, Maharashtra, India, GTL Infra has about 28,000 towers located across 22 telecom circles in India, which enables telecom service providers to offer 2G, 3G and 4G services across the country.

Incorporated in 2004, under the Founder, chairman, Manoj G Tirodkar, GTL Infra introduced the shared Infrastructure space. For FY 2016–17, GTL Infra registered revenue of Rs. 2286 crores and EBIDTA of Rs. 1,122 crores.

The board of directors consists of chairman, Manoj G Tirodkar, N. Balasubramanian, Vice Chairman and Ind. Director; Milind Naik, full Time Director and COO; Charudatta Naik Director, Dr. Anand Patkar, Independent Director; Vinod B. Agarwala, Independent Director; Vijay M. Vij, Independent Director and Sonali P. Choudhary, Director.

The executive management team has Milind Naik;  Milind Bengali, COO; L. Y. Desai, CFO; Prasanna Bidnurkar, Head CDR Operations; Bhupendra Kiny, Head-Pricing & Costing; Ashutosh Chandratrey Sr. V. P. – Human Resources; R. S. Ahluwalia, President – Business Development and Eugene Valles, Vice President – Training and OD.

History
In the late 1990s, the telecom sector was in India was liberalised which led to a boom in the industry. All telecom players benefited from the explosive growth and opportunities it brought up. In 2006, GTL Infra became the first company in the shared telecom space to be listed on stock exchanges (BSE & NSE).  The next year, the company came out with a rights issue of US$83.86 million. In 2010, the GTL Infra acquired 17,500 towers and 21000 tenants from Aircel.

2010 onwards
The telecom industry took a serious hit in 2010, when the government cancelled 122 telecom licences owing to the 2G license case. GTL Infra too suffered with the cancellation of licences as its customers reduced because of issues faced by Aircel and Maxis and subsequent cancellation of ROFR by Aircel.

In 2011, GTL Infra completed its Corporate Debt Restructuring and in 2016–17 it has completed the first phase of Strategic Debt restructuring, which has brought down the debt of the company to a sustainable Rs. 4,841 crores.

Shareholding
The number of equity shares of GTL Infra are approx. 12.61 billion. The Promoter group, GTL Limited along with Global Holding Corporation Pvt Ltd, holds approx. 3.36% of the total equity shares, whereas the banks and financial institutions hold about 63.2% of equity shares in terms of Strategic Debt structuring Scheme. Balance are held by public shareholders, including FIIs and corporate bodies. IDBI Trusteeship Services Limited is the largest non-promoter investor in the company with 16.38% shareholding as in September 2021, filed with the stock exchanges in India.

Listing
The company's equity shares are listed on the National Stock Exchange of India Limited (NSE) and the BSE Limited. The Foreign Currency Convertible Bonds are listed on Singapore Exchange Securities Trading Limited.

Services
GTL Infra owns a blend of Urban and Rural telecom towers located in all the 22 Telecom Circles in India, which are shared by all Telecom Operators in the country. GTL Infra offers a fixed and predictable OPEX model and network up time of 99.9% for its customers by real time monitoring from its NOC (Network Operations Centre) and Operations and maintenance services.

Mergers and acquisitions
In 2010, GTL Infra made acquisition of Aircel's 17,500 towers and 21000 tenants.

Awards &Recognition
 GTL Infra received the Best Infrastructure Brands award from Economic Times in 2016.
 GTL Infra received the ‘Best Independent Infrastructure Provider’ in the Telecom Operator Award 2010 by leading telecom magazine tele.net.
 GTL Infra was received the 10th Greentech Environment Excellence Silver Award in 2009 by Greentech.

References

External links
GTL Infrastructure Official Website

Companies based in Mumbai
Indian companies established in 2004
Telecommunications companies established in 2004
2004 establishments in Maharashtra
Companies listed on the National Stock Exchange of India
Companies listed on the Bombay Stock Exchange